Johnstown is an unincorporated community in Raleigh County, West Virginia,  United States.

References 

Unincorporated communities in West Virginia
Unincorporated communities in Raleigh County, West Virginia